Cheikh is an alternate spelling of Sheikh, an Arab leader

Cheikh may also refer to:

People
 Cheikh Anta Diop, a Senegalese historian and anthropologist
 Cheikh Sabaly, a Senegalese footballer
 Cheikh Hamidou Kane, a Senegalese writer
 Cheikh Lô, a Senegalese musician

Geography
 Cheikh Taba, a town in the Akkar District, Lebanon